Orangutans have often attracted attention in popular culture. They are mentioned extensively in works of fiction and video games, while some captive individuals have drawn much attention in real life.

Individuals
Ah Meng (1960–2008), Sumatran orangutan of Singapore
Ken Allen (1971–2000) was a Bornean orangutan at the San Diego Zoo known for his escape artistry. He unscrewed bolts with his fingers, reached around things and climbed steep walls to find temporary freedom. When keepers discovered and closed one of his escape routes he would find another. At least once he was found out among zoo visitors and was led by the hand to a keeper by a visitor. Ken Allen died in 2000.
Tom (born 1983) is known as the "king" of orangutans in the vicinity of the research base Camp Leakey, Tanjung Puting. Most of the visitors that go to the area are looking for him.
Kopral, an orangutan known for managing to survive and adapt despite the double amputation of both his arms.
Dora, an female orangutan at Indonesia's Surabaya Zoo, remarkable for her morbid obesity and her later online fame as the internet meme "Le Monke".
Joe Martin (orangutan), silent-era Hollywood film performer

Orangutans in specific works of fiction

In Jules Verne's The Mysterious Island the castaways had a red ape named Jupiter.
Melincourt (first published 1817) by the English author Thomas Love Peacock has an orangutan called Sir Oran Haut-Ton, who is put forward as a candidate for election as a member of parliament.
 An orangutan is featured in Edgar Allan Poe's short story The Murders in the Rue Morgue.
Disney's 1967 animated musical adaptation of The Jungle Book added an orangutan called King Louie to Rudyard Kipling's original cast of anthropomorphic characters.  He also appeared in the Disney Channel's TaleSpin, but is only referred to as "Louie."
In Kipling’s short story Bertran and Bimi, an ostensibly domesticated orangutan — “mad mit der jealousy” over his owner’s marriage — brings matters to a bad end.
In The Light Fantastic, the second book of Terry Pratchett's Discworld series of fantasy novels,  The Librarian of the Unseen University is unintentionally turned into an orangutan. He remains so throughout the series and actively prevents attempts to change him back.
The orangutan Clyde is Clint Eastwood's pet sidekick in the film Every Which Way but Loose and its sequel Any Which Way You Can.
In the film Dunston Checks In, a young boy befriends a larcenous orangutan in a luxury hotel.
In the film Jay and Silent Bob Strike Back, the protagonists rescue an orangutan named Suzanne from an animal testing laboratory. The trio also appear in the closing scenes of Mallrats.
Shirt Tales, a 1980s cartoon series produced by Hanna-Barbera featured Bogey Orangutan (so called because he spoke with a Humphrey Bogart-style voice).
Dr. Splitz/Splitzy is an orangutan made sentient by an alien race in the science fiction cartoon Captain Simian & the Space Monkeys.
In Nickelodeon's The Wild Thornberrys, the character Donnie was raised by orangutans for a while after his parents were killed by poachers, as revealed in "The Secret of Donnie".
In Nickelodeon's Drake & Josh, Drake bought an orangutan named Bobo from a car dealership then sold it to a man who meant to eat him.
In the Futurama episode "The Problem with Popplers", Zapp Brannigan fooled aliens into eating an orangutan in order to save Leela.
In Fear and Loathing in Las Vegas, Raoul Duke is interested in buying an orangutan but later in the book it attacks people and is taken away.
In the Rob Schneider movie The Animal, Rob's character gets involved in a slapping fight and eventually wrestles with an orangutan.
In Patrick O'Brian's novel The Thirteen Gun Salute, thirteenth book of the Aubrey-Maturin series, Stephen Maturin is accompanied during his stay at a Buddhist monastery by an elderly female orangutan named Muong.
In Rise of the Planet of the Apes and its sequels Dawn of the Planet of the Apes and War for the Planet of the Apes, one of the most prominent apes is an orangutan named Maurice. With a history in the circus, he is able to use sign language even before being made smarter by the ALZ-113 viral drug. Thus he is one of the first apes to befriend the protagonist, the intelligent chimpanzee Caesar, and becomes his close adviser.
Michael Crichton's novel Next features a transgenic orangutan in Sumatra that speaks French and Dutch.
 The film Babe: Pig in the City features an orangutan who likes to dress in human clothes.
The 1986 film Link features a super-smart orangutan as the main villain.
The UK company SSE plc uses, in its advertising campaign, an orangutan called Maya as their mascot.
In Robertson Davies novel World of Wonders, part of which is set in  a traveling circus, an orangutan named Rongo is featured. The ape is treated like a person, occupying his own berth on trains and not being caged.  
In JoJo's Bizarre Adventure: Stardust Crusaders, an orangutan named Forever is featured as an antagonist. He is very intelligent, displaying human mannerisms such as smoking, pride, and lusts after human females (a la the movie Link), and wields a Stand (a psychic manifestation of one's fighting spirit) named Strength, named after the tarot card. This Stand is partially why he has human mannerisms and also is able to bind itself to ships, granting Forever complete control over it.
In Kidsongs: Very Silly Songs, after seeing a box with a warning sign, the Kidsongs Kids and their friends Silly Willy and Silly Jilly decide to visit Jim Along Josie the orangutan at his cabin.
Rainforest Cafe's Wild Bunch features an orangutan named Ozzie.

Orangutans in video games
 Manky Kongs are recurring antagonists in the SNES' Donkey Kong Country. They are barrel-rolling orangutans (as opposed to a real member of the Kong family) appearing in a number of levels. There is a level heavily featuring them named "Orang-utan Gang".
 In Donkey Kong 64, Lanky Kong is a Sumatran orangutan who uses his very long arms to good effect to reach otherwise out-of-bounds areas (in fact, there is a glitch in the game such that by very careful positioning of Lanky using the move he can open and enter doors that are supposed to be locked behind a keeper by touching them). A potion also enables him to do OrangStand, walking on his hands to climb steep slopes. He also appears in other related games such as Super Smash Bros. Brawl.
 In Metal Slug 3, an unnamed AI-controlled orangutan wearing diapers may appear to aid the player on killing zombies with a weapon similar to an Uzi submachine gun.
 The Pokémon Darmanitan and Oranguru are both based on orangutans.
In Sekiro: Shadows Die Twice, the Sculptor of the Dilapidated Temple, the protagonist's ally is often referred to as "Orangutan", owing to his physical appearance. Near the endgame, it is possible to fight a demonic manifestation (which is later revealed to be the Sculptor losing himself to his strong feelings of Hatred) depicted as an orangutan looking demon, engulfed in flames.
Gorrila Tag is a Vr Video Game consisting of orangutans that tag people.

See also
Gorillas in popular culture
List of fictional apes

References

Further reading
 Pollock, Mary S. and Catherine Rainwater (eds). Figuring Animals: Essays on Animal Images in Art, Literature, Philosophy & Popular Culture. Palgrave Macmillan, .
 Rothfels, Nigel. (2002) Representing animals. Indiana University Press, .

Apes in popular culture
 
Popular Culture